Brinsmade is a surname. Notable people with the surname include:

Allen T. Brinsmade (1837–1913), American politician
Peter A. Brinsmade (1804–1859), American-born businessman
Thomas C. Brinsmade (1802–1868), American physician and academic administrator